The 1975–76 Cleveland Crusaders season was the Cleveland Crusaders' fourth season of operation in the World Hockey Association. It was the last season of the franchise in Cleveland, Ohio. It would relocate to Minnesota for the next season.

Offseason

Regular season

Final standings

Game log

Playoffs

New England Whalers 3, Cleveland Crusaders 0 - Preliminary Round

Player stats

Note: Pos = Position; GP = Games played; G = Goals; A = Assists; Pts = Points; +/- = plus/minus; PIM = Penalty minutes; PPG = Power-play goals; SHG = Short-handed goals; GWG = Game-winning goals
      MIN = Minutes played; W = Wins; L = Losses; T = Ties; GA = Goals-against; GAA = Goals-against average; SO = Shutouts;

Awards and records

Transactions

Roster

Draft picks
Cleveland's draft picks at the 1975 WHA Amateur Draft.

Farm teams

See also
1975–76 WHA season

References

External links

Cleveland Crusaders seasons
Cleve
Cleve